The men's +105 kilograms event at the 2014 Asian Games took place on 26 September 2014 at Moonlight Festival Garden Weightlifting Venue.

Schedule
All times are Korea Standard Time (UTC+09:00)

Records

Results 
Legend
NM — No mark

 Mohammed Jassim of Iraq originally finished 7th, but was disqualified after he tested positive for Etiocholanolone.

New records
The following records were established during the competition.

References

External links
 Official website

Weightlifting at the 2014 Asian Games